SS New Australia was a UK-built turbo-electric passenger steamship that had a varied career from 1931 to 1966. She was built as the ocean liner Monarch of Bermuda, was a troop ship in the Second World War and was damaged by fire in 1947.

She was then refitted to carry emigrants to Australia and renamed New Australia. In 1958 she was refitted again, renamed Arkadia and served as both a transatlantic liner and a cruise ship.

History

Building
Vickers-Armstrongs built Monarch of Bermuda at its shipyard in Walker, Newcastle upon Tyne for Furness, Withy & Co Ltd. She was launched on 17 March 1931 and completed that November.

The boilers supplied steam at 400 lbf/in2 to two steam turbines. GEC built her alternators and motors.

She had luxury berths for 830 passengers and capacity for refrigerated cargo.

Furness, Withy service
Furness, Withy had Monarch of Bermuda built for its Furness Bermuda Line subsidiary. She operated a liner service between New York and Hamilton, Bermuda, following the loss of MV Bermuda (which was heavily damaged by fire at Hamilton on 17 June 1931, returned to the builders in Belfast for repairs but burned again, then was wrecked in Scotland while under tow to be scrapped).

In the early hours of 8 September 1934 Ward Line's  liner  caught fire eight miles off the coast of New Jersey.  Monarch of Bermuda was one of several ships that diverted to help. The fire had spread so swiftly that many of Morro Castles passengers were unable to reach her lifeboats. Some leapt into the sea, and Monarch of Bermuda managed to rescue some of them.

In the Second World War Monarch of Bermuda served as a troop ship.

Rebuilding and Shaw, Savill service
After the war Palmers' shipyard in Hebburn started refitting Monarch of Bermuda for her return to civilian service, but on 24 May 1947 she was gutted by fire. She was sold for scrap, but the Ministry of Transport bought her and contracted JI Thornycroft & Co to refit her with economy accommodation for 1,600 passengers.

The ship originally had three funnels. Thornycroft rebuilt her with a single funnel, plus an unusual bipod structure aft of her bridge that served as both a funnel and a mainmast. The MoT renamed her New Australia, contracted Shaw, Savill & Albion Line to manage her and put her into service carrying UK emigrants to Australia. She plied this trade from 1950 until 1957.

In September 1958 New Australia was serving as a troop ship again when she suffered slight damage in a collision with a tanker in the Torres Strait.

Refitting and Greek Line service
In 1958 the MoT sold the ship to Ornos Shipping Co Ltd of London, who sold her on to the Arcadia Steamship Corporation. This was part of Greek Line, who had Blohm & Voss in Hamburg repair and refit her. Her foremast was replaced with two king-posts. Her forepeak had been damaged in the collision, so it was remodelled to give her a curved stem. She was now .

Greek Line renamed the ship Arkadia and used her on both the transatlantic liner trade to Canada and cruises for most of the 1960s.

Arkadias final voyage was to Valencia in Spain, where she arrived on 18 December 1966 to be scrapped.

References

Bibliography

1931 ships
Cruise ships of Greece
Passenger ships of the United Kingdom
Ship fires
Ships built on the River Tyne
Ships built by Vickers Armstrong
Steamships of Greece
Steamships of the United Kingdom
Troop ships of the United Kingdom